Tony Madison (born 1971) is a retired professional American basketball player who played NCAA basketball for the New Orleans Privateers.

He is most famous for playing in the Lebanese Basketball League for Tadamon Zouk Lebanese basketball club for many seasons. He later played for Champville SC, Al-Riyadi and again Champville SC in the same league. He is regarded as one of the best imports in the Middle East after having played in Lebanon, Saudi Arabia and Iran.

Career 
  University of New Orleans
  Tadamon Zouk
  Champville SC
  Al-Riyadi
  Al-Ittihad
  Mahram Tehran (2007–08)
  Petrochimi Bandar Imam (2008–10)
  Champville SC (2010)

References

1971 births
Living people
American expatriate basketball people in Iran
American expatriate basketball people in Lebanon
American expatriate basketball people in Saudi Arabia
American men's basketball players
Mahram Tehran BC players
New Orleans Privateers men's basketball players
Al Riyadi Club Beirut basketball players